Man Without a Gun is an American western television series produced by 20th Century Fox Television and presented on the NTA Film Network and in first-run syndication in the United States from 1957 to 1959. Set in the town of Yellowstone near Yellowstone National Park in the then Dakota Territory during the 1870s, the program starred Rex Reason as newspaper editor Adam MacLean, who brought miscreants to justice without the use of violence or gunplay but through his Yellowstone Sentinel. The co-star was Mort Mills, as Marshal Frank Tallman, who intervened when the "pen" proved not to be "mightier than the sword".Harry Harvey, Sr., was cast in twenty-one episodes as Yellowstone Mayor George Dixon.

The program is considered to have been unique because it showcased MacLean's moral ethics and common sense to bring outlaws to justice. The show was also used as a schoolroom to teach the youngsters of the 1950s about decency and the differences between right and wrong.

Guest stars

Chris Alcaide - as Johnny Kansas in two episodes ("Teen-Age Idol", "The Hero")
John Anderson ("Eye Witness")
Whit Bissell - as Mark Ryan in the "Aftermath" episode
Lloyd Corrigan
Dennis Cross - as Cheotah in the "Indian Fury" episode
John Doucette - as Dan Kester in "The Fugitive" episode
James Drury - as Cort Hamish in the "Aftermath" episode 
Stanley Fafara - as Boy in the "Eye Witness" episode
Stanley Farrar - as Auges in two episodes ("Guilty", "Eye Witness")
Bruce Gordon - as Wolf Manson in the "Headline" episode
Don Gordon ("Jailbreak")
Dabbs Greer - as Ben McLaren in the "Hangtree Inn" episode
Ron Hagerthy - as Tod Wilburn in the "Witness to Terror" episode 
Myron Healey - as Yank Sullivan in the "Decoy" episode
Diane Jergens - as Ellen in the "Night of Violence" episode
Robert Karnes - as Jonas in the "Invisible Enemy" episode 
Dayton Lummis - as Fred Hawkins in "The Fugitive" episode
Carole Mathews - as Rose in the "Lady from Laramie" episode
Doug McClure - as Albert (or Ollie) Ketchum in "The Kidder" episode
Patrick McVey - as Forester in the "Special Edition" episode
James Philbrook - as Troy in the "Decoy" episode
Dorothy Provine - as Lucy in the "Man Missing" episode
Denver Pyle ("Shadow of a Gun")
Victor Rodman ("Devil's Acre")
Robert F. Simon - as Hamish Sr. in the "Aftermath" episode
Olan Soule - as Henry Holbrook in the "Daughter of the Dragon" episode
Ray Teal ("The Day The West Went Wild")
Marie Tsien - as Chi Ying in the "Daughter of the Dragon" episode 
Robert J. Wilke - as Hackett in the "Buried Treasure" episode
Victor Sen Yung - as Ho Wang in the "Daughter of the Dragon" episode

After Man Without a Gun, Rex Reason was again cast as a reporter, Scott Norris, on ABC's crime drama, The Roaring Twenties, with co-stars Dorothy Provine (who had guest-starred on Man Without a Gun), John Dehner, Donald May, Mike Road, and Gary Vinson. Mort Mills later appeared as a semi-regular on NBC's most successful western, Bonanza.

Episodes

Season 1 (1957-1958)

Season 2 (1959)

References

External links 
 
 Classic TV Archive episode listing

1950s Western (genre) television series
Black-and-white American television shows
First-run syndicated television programs in the United States
1957 American television series debuts
1959 American television series endings
Television series by 20th Century Fox Television
Television shows set in Wyoming
Television series by CBS Studios